Pavel Vasilyevich Khalkiopov (born in 1905 in Moscow; died 2 September 1968 in Moscow) was a Soviet Russian football player and coach.

External links
 

1905 births
Footballers from Moscow
1968 deaths
Soviet footballers
PFC CSKA Moscow players
Soviet football managers
PFC CSKA Moscow managers
Association football defenders